Romulus Football Club is a football club based in Birmingham, England and play at the CV Stadium. The club was formed in 1979 by club president Roger Evans, initially the team played Sunday league football

History
Romulus Football Club was formed in 1979 by the current club President Roger Evans and Ken Powell. Initially the team played Sunday league football.  After a number of successful years they stepped up to senior football in 1999, entering the Midland Football Combination.  In 2003–04 they won this league and were promoted to the Midland Football Alliance.  In 2006–07 they finished second in the Alliance and were promoted to the Southern League Division One Midlands,  In 2010 the club was switched to the Northern Premier League Division One South.  In 2018 the club was relegated and placed into the Midland League Premier Division. In the 2019–20 season Romulus got to the final of the Midland League Cup, but the final was postponed due to the COVID-19 pandemic.

Ground
For many years Romulus shared a ground with Sutton Coldfield Town at Coles Lane. At the start of the 2018–19 season the club returned to their original base at Castle Vale Stadium in the Castle Vale area of Birmingham. The stadium boasts a 3G pitch and an air conditioned clubhouse.

Romulus also own a training ground on Lindridge Road, Birmingham where they have a full time college for football players age 16 to 19 years of age.
From their academy the club have produced many full time professional players.

Management and coaching staff

Records
Best league performance: Southern League Division One Midlands, 8th, 2009–10
Best FA Cup performance: 2nd Qualifying Round, 2006–07, 2008–09, 2018–19
Best FA Trophy performance: 2nd Qualifying Round, 2008–09
Best FA Vase performance: 3rd Round, 2006–07

See also
Romulus F.C. players

References

External links
Official website

Football clubs in England
Southern Football League clubs
Sport in Birmingham, West Midlands
Football clubs in the West Midlands (county)
1979 establishments in England
Association football clubs established in 1979